
This is a list of the National Register of Historic Places entries in Columbus, Ohio, United States. The National Register is a federal register for buildings, structures, and sites of historic significance. This is intended to be a complete list of the properties and districts in Columbus.

There are 350 properties and districts listed on the National Register in Franklin County, including 3 National Historic Landmarks. The city of Columbus is the location of 174 of these properties and districts, including all of the National Historic Landmarks; they are listed here, while the remaining properties and districts are listed separately. Another 2 properties were once listed but have been removed. Of the sites on the National Register in Columbus, 54 are also on the Columbus Register of Historic Properties, the city's list of local landmarks.

Current listings

 Numbers represent an ordering by significant words.  Different colors, defined above, differentiate individual listings from districts, National Historic Landmarks, and delisted sites.

|}

Former listings

|}

See also
 Columbus Register of Historic Properties
 List of National Historic Landmarks in Ohio
 National Register of Historic Places listings in Ohio
 National Register of Historic Places listings in Franklin County, Ohio

References

External links

 Map of national and local historic sites and districts, Ohio History Connection

Columbus
History of Columbus, Ohio
Columbus, Ohio
 
Columbus, Ohio-related lists